Bhuwana is a census town in the Girwa tehsil of Udaipur district, Rajasthan. It is situated on the Udaipur-Nathdwara highway, around 4 km from the city center, 2 km from Bargaon and around 387 km from the state capital Jaipur.

Demographics
Mewadi and Hindi is the local language, but people knowing English are also commonly available. Bhuwana has population of 17,665 (in 2011), of which 9,168 are males while 8,497 are females.

Schools
 Govt. Higher Secondary School
 Swami Public School Bhuwana
 Maharshi Dadhichya Ups
 G.U.P.S.Ramnagar
 NBS U.P.S.
 Shiv Public U.P.S., Chitrakutnagar

References

Cities and towns in Udaipur district